Mashriq is the cultural and geographical region in the eastern part of the Arab world.

Mashriq or Mashreq or Mashrek (Arabic: مشرق) and francicized Machrek or Machriq, may also refer to:

Mashriq
 Al-Machriq (The East), a journal founded in 1898, published by Saint Joseph University in Beirut, Lebanon
 Al-Mashriq, Iraqi daily newspaper
 Daily Mashriq, daily newspaper in Pakistan
 Mashriq TV, British-Pakistani television channel
 Mashriqu'l-Adhkar, Bahá'í House of Worship ("Dawning-place of the remembrances of God")
 Mashriq wahy (1817–1892), name for Bahá'u'lláh

Mashreq
 Mashreq (bank), the oldest privately owned bank in the United Arab Emirates founded as the Bank of Oman in 1967
 Mashreq University, a private university located in Khartoum North in Sudan

Mashrek
Bank Al Mashrek, defunct bank in Lebanon under CEO Roger Tamraz

See also
 Levant, an approximate historical geographical term referring to a large area in the Eastern Mediterranean region of Western Asia
 Middle East, in its narrower sense includes the Mashriq countries
 Maghreb, the Arab World west of Egypt, that includes Algeria, Libya, Mauritania, Morocco and Tunisia
 Mashriqi Arabic or Eastern Arabic, or Mashriqi ʿAmmiya, encompasses the varieties of Arabic spoken in the Mashriq
 Mashriqi numerals, another term for Eastern Arabic numerals
 Mashriqiyyun, the "Easterners", alternative name for Mizrahi Jews